Matapédia may refer to:

Places in Quebec, Canada
Matapédia, Quebec, a municipality
La Matapédia Regional County Municipality
Matapédia (electoral district), a provincial electoral district
Matapédia River
Matapédia Valley
Lake Matapédia, the source of the Matapédia river
Matapédia station, a railway station on the Montreal to Halifax passenger service
Saint-Alexis-de-Matapédia, a municipality

Other
Matapédia (album), by Kate & Anna McGarrigle, 1996
, a corvette of the Canadian navy in World War II

See also